Dominik Rotter (born 8 July 1990) is an Austrian footballer.

On 4 May 2019, he scored 12 goals for SC Wiener Viktoria when the team beat FV Wien Floridsdorf 13:0.

References

1990 births
Living people
Association football forwards
Austrian footballers
Arminia Bielefeld players
2. Bundesliga players
SC Austria Lustenau players
First Vienna FC players